The Assassination of Saint Peter Martyr is a 67 by 100 cm oil and tempera on wood painting by Giovanni Bellini. It was painted around 1507 and is now in the National Gallery, London, whilst a workshop version of around 1509 is now in the Courtauld Gallery. They both show the murder of saint Peter Martyr.

References

External links
The Assassination of Saint Peter Martyr (video) – The National Gallery (London)

1507 paintings
Collections of the National Gallery, London
Paintings in the collection of the Courtauld Institute of Art
Paintings by Giovanni Bellini
Paintings of Peter of Verona